Mahagodayaya is a tiny village near Buttala in the Monaragala District of Sri Lanka, where 9 Sinhalese civilians were killed by suspected LTTE cadres in an incident known as the Mahagodayaya massacre.

Incident 

This incident took place on 12 April 2009, two days before the Sinhala and Hindu New Year. A group of LTTE terrorists stormed in to the village at around 7.30 pm and killed 9 Sinhalese including a one and half year old infant and an 11-year-old boy.

References

2009 crimes in Sri Lanka
Attacks on civilians attributed to the Liberation Tigers of Tamil Eelam
Massacres in Sri Lanka
Liberation Tigers of Tamil Eelam attacks in Eelam War IV
Mass murder in 2009
Terrorist incidents in Sri Lanka in 2009